Shengavit or Shengavit or Shinkovit or Shingaīt may refer to:

Shengavit Settlement, 4th- to 2nd-millennium BC ruins of a town located in Yerevan, Armenia
Shengavit District, part of Yerevan, Armenia
Nerkin Shengavit, part of Shengavit District
Verin Shengavit, part of Shengavit District
Shengavit (Yerevan Metro), a railway station
Shengavit FC, a defunct football club
Shengavit Medical Center, a hospital in Yerevan, Armenia